Acacia pachyphylla is a shrub belonging to the genus Acacia and the subgenus Phyllodineae that is endemic to south western Australia.

Description
Like most species of Acacia it has phyllodes rather than true leaves. It blooms from October to December and produces yellow flowers. The seed pods that form after flowering are not constricted between each of the seeds.

Distribution
It is native to an area along the south coast in the Goldfields-Esperance region of Western Australia where it is commonly situated on flat or undulating sandplains or along the margins of salt lakes growing in sandy soils over or around limestone or sandy-loamy, clay or gravelly soils The bulk of the population is found from around Young River in the west to around Israelite Bay in the east and extending as far north as  where it is often a part of open shrub mallee over heathland communities.

See also
 List of Acacia species

References

pachyphylla
Acacias of Western Australia
Taxa named by Bruce Maslin
Plants described in 1999